Pasión gitana, is a Mexican telenovela produced by Televisa and originally transmitted by Telesistema Mexicano.

Cast 
Teresa Velázquez as Gitana Tere
Aldo Monti as Conde Rolando de Monforte
Luis Aragón
Aarón Hernán
Norma Herrera
Miguel Manzano
Gilda Mirós
Fanny Schiller
Miguel Suárez
Jorge Vargas as Mario
Aurora Cortés
Mario Casillas
Jorge Casanova

References

External links 

Mexican telenovelas
Televisa telenovelas
Spanish-language telenovelas
1968 telenovelas
1968 Mexican television series debuts
1968 Mexican television series endings